The following is a timeline of the history of the city of Płock, Poland.

Prior to 16th century

 1075 – Roman Catholic Diocese of Płock established.
 1079 – Capital of Poland moved from Kraków to Płock.
 1138
 Capital of Poland moved from Płock back to Kraków.
 Płock became capital of the Duchy of Masovia, a provincial duchy of Poland.
 1144 – Płock Cathedral consecrated.
 1180 – Marshal Stanisław Małachowski High School (Małachowianka), the oldest still existing school in Poland and one of the oldest in Europe, founded.
 1225 – Dominicans came to Płock.
 1237 – Płock granted city rights.
 1255 – City rights renewed.
 1353 – Polish King Casimir III the Great created a fund for the construction of defensive walls.
 1356 – Saint Bartholomew church consecrated.
 1405 – Holy Trinity Hospital established.
 1495 – Płock became capital of the Płock Voivodeship.

16th to 19th centuries
 1655 – City invaded by Sweden.
 1705 – City invaded by Sweden.
 1793 – City annexed by Prussia in the Second Partition of Poland.
 1807 – City included within the Duchy of Warsaw and made the capital of the Płock Department.
 1815 – City became part of so-called Congress Poland in the Russian Partition of Poland.
 1820 – Płock Scientific Society founded.
 1831 – Last Sejm (parliament session) of Congress Poland was held in Płock.
 1863
 Polish January Uprising against Russia fought in the area.
 15 May: Zygmunt Padlewski, leader of the January Uprising in the Płock region, executed by the Russians.
 1885 – Rowing society founded.
 1894 – City water tower built.

20th century

1901–1939

 1903 – Diocesan Museum founded.
 1906 – Mariavite Church founded by Maria Franciszka Kozłowska.
 1914 – Temple of Mercy and Charity completed and consecrated.
 1915 – World War I: city occupied by Germany.
 1918 – Płock became again part of Poland following the nation's restoration of independence.
 1920 – August: Successful heroic Polish defense against the invading Russians during the Polish–Soviet War. 250 Polish defenders, including 100 civilians, killed in the battle.
 1921 – Visit of Marshal Józef Piłsudski, Płock awarded with the Cross of Valour as the second Polish city to be awarded with a Polish military decoration (after Lwów).
 1923 – Radziwie included within city limits.
 1938 – Legions of Marshal Józef Piłsudski Bridge completed.

World War II (1939–1945)
 1939
 September: German bombing of the city at the beginning of the invasion of Poland and World War II.
 September: Beginning of German occupation.
 Nazi prison for Poles established by the Germans.
 Polish associations, institutions and press closed by the occupiers.
 Looting of Polish collections, archives, museums, the cathedral's ancient treasury and diocesan library by the Germans.
 10, 13 November: Executions of 12 Poles perpetrated by the Germans in Płock.
 November: First expulsions of Poles carried out by the Schutzpolizei.
 Seminary converted into barracks of the SS.
 October 1939–March 1940: Massacres of around 200 Poles, incl. teachers, activists, shopowners, notaries, local officials, pharmacists, directors and members of the Polish Military Organisation, perpetrated by the Germans in Łąck near Płock during the Intelligenzaktion.
 1940
 28 February: Archbishop of Płock Antoni Julian Nowowiejski and auxiliary Bishop Leon Wetmański imprisoned by the Germans.
 March: Archbishop Antoni Julian Nowowiejski and auxiliary Bishop Leon Wetmański sent from Słupno, where they were imprisoned, to the Soldau concentration camp and eventually killed.
 4–9 April: Mass arrests of 2,000 Poles, incl. teachers, local officials, priests.
 June: Further 200 Poles from various locations in the region imprisoned in the local prison, with some eventually deported to the Soldau concentration camp and murdered.
 Massacre of 80 elderly and disabled people from Płock perpetrated by the German Security Police in Brwilno near Płock.
 1 September: Jewish ghetto established by the Germans.
 1941
 20–21 February: SS and Schutzpolizei start the liquidation of the Jewish ghetto. First deportation of Jews to the Soldau concentration camp; sick and disabled people were killed on the spot.
 28 February: Massacre of 25 Jews perpetrated by the Germans.
 1 March: Ghetto liquidated, last Jews deported to the Soldau concentration camp.
 Two forced labour subcamps of the local prison established by the occupiers.
 Arbeitserziehungslager Schröttersburg-Süd forced labour camp established by the occupiers.
 1942
 18 September: Public hanging of 13 Polish resistance members in the Old Town.
 Arbeitserziehungslager Schröttersburg-Süd forced labour camp dissolved.
 Winter: Freight train with kidnapped Polish children arrived to the Płock-Radziwie station; around 300 of the children froze to death and were buried by the Germans in the forest of Łąck near Płock.
 1943 – Sicherheitspolizei begins deportations of Poles including teenage boys to the Stutthof concentration camp.
 1945
 January: 79 Poles burned alive by the retreating German forces.
 21 January: End of German occupation.

1945–2000
 1947 – Wisła Płock football club founded.
 1948 – Harvest machinery factory established.
 1964 – Wisła Płock handball team founded.
 1965 – Płock refinery completed.
 1973 – Stadion im. Kazimierza Górskiego (football stadium) built.
 1975 – City became capital of Płock Voivodeship.

 1991 – Visit of Pope John Paul II.
 1995 – Wisła Płock wins its first Polish handball championship.
 1999 – City becomes part of the Masovian Voivodeship following an administrative reform.

21st century
 2007 – Solidarity Bridge completed.
 2010 – Orlen Arena completed.
 2011 – Płock Pier opened.
 2014 – Mira Zimińska monument unveiled.
 2018 – Płock co-hosts the 2018 FIVB Volleyball Men's Club World Championship.
 2021
 May: PKN Orlen Research and Development Center opened.
 September: Stanisław Małachowski monument unveiled.

References

Bibliography
 
 

 
Plock
Plock
Years in Poland